Peru competed at the 1956 Summer Olympics in Melbourne, Australia. They sent eight athletes to the shooting competition. The youngest was Oscar Caceres who was 24 and the oldest was Guillermo Cornejo who was 37. The whole team was composed of male competitors.

Shooting

Pistol

Rifle

References

External links
Official Olympic Reports

Nations at the 1956 Summer Olympics
1956
1956 in Peruvian sport